Veterans Memorial High School is the name of several high schools in the United States.

Veterans Memorial High School (Brownsville, Texas), a public high school in the Brownsville Independent School District
Veterans Memorial High School (Corpus Christi, Texas), a public high school in the Corpus Christi Independent School District
Veterans Memorial High School (San Antonio), a public high school in the Judson Independent School District, Texas
Veterans Memorial High School (Mission, Texas), a public high school in the Mission Independent School District
Peabody Veterans Memorial High School, a public high school in the Peabody Public School District, Peabody, Massachusetts
Warwick Veterans Memorial High School, a school in Warwick, Rhode Island

See also 
 Memorial High School, a list of schools